is a Japanese professional footballer who plays as a defender for Italian Serie A club AS Roma and the Japan women's national team.

Early life 
Minami was born in Saitama Prefecture on 7 December 1998. She attended high school in Saitama Prefectural Nanryō High School. She graduated from University of Tsukuba Physical Education College in 2021. She begun her youth career when she joined the junior youth team of Urawa Red Diamonds Ladies.

Club career

Urawa Reds 
She was promoted to Nadeshiko League club Urawa Reds from the youth team in 2017.

AS Roma 
On 24 July 2022, Minami signed a two-year contract with Italian Serie A club Roma. She made her debut for the club on 19 August 2022 in a 3-1 UEFA Champions League win against Glasgow City. On 10 September 2022, she scored her first goal for the club in a Serie A match against AC Milan. Later in the same month, she scored again for the club in a 4-1 win against Sparta Praha in the UEFA Champions League. On 5 November, Minami won her first silverware with Roma as they beaten Juventus in a penalty shootout in the 2022 Supercoppa Italiana.

International career

Youth 
In 2014, Minami was selected for the Japan U-17 national team for the 2014 U-17 World Cup. She played one game against Paraguay in the group stage. Japan went on to win the championship. 

In 2018, Minami was selected for the Japan U-20 national team for the 2018 U-20 World Cup. She played all six matches as center-back and team captain. Japan won the championship and Minami received the Bronze Ball award.

Senior 
In February 2019, Minami was selected for the Japan national team for the SheBelieves Cup. At this tournament, on 2 March, she debuted as center back-against Brazil. 

Minami was selected as part of the 22 players squad for the 2020 Summer Olympics held in Japan in 2021. She started all 3 group matches for Japan.

Career statistics

Club

International

International goals

Honours 
Urawa Reds
 Nadeshiko League: 2020
 Empress's Cup: 2021
 Empress's Cup runner-up: 2019, 2020
 Nadeshiko League Cup runner-up: 2017
AS Roma
 Supercoppa Italiana: 2022
Japan U17
 AFC U-16 Women's Championship: 2013
 FIFA U-17 Women's World Cup: 2014
Japan U20
 AFC U-20 Women's Asian Championship: 2017
 FIFA U-20 Women's World Cup: 2018
Japan
 EAFF E-1 Football Championship: 2019
Individual
 EAFF E-1 Football Championship MVP: 2019
 Nadeshiko League/WE League Best Eleven: 2019, 2020, 2021-2022

References

External links

Japan Football Association

1998 births
Living people
Association football people from Saitama Prefecture
Japanese women's footballers
Women's association football central defenders
Urawa Red Diamonds Ladies players
A.S. Roma (women) players
Nadeshiko League players
Serie A (women's football) players
Japan women's international footballers
2019 FIFA Women's World Cup players
Footballers at the 2020 Summer Olympics
Olympic footballers of Japan
Japanese expatriate footballers
Expatriate women's footballers in Italy
Japanese expatriate sportspeople in Italy